"Obvious" is the third single to be released from the American R&B singer LeToya's debut album LeToya. According to Billboard, due to LeToya's popularity and feedback from radio, the single had a 96% chance of becoming a hit, but due to the fusing of Capitol Records and Virgin Records, all funding for the album were frozen until the completion of the merger. In addition to LeToya, the merger affected other Capitol and Virgin Records artist such as Janet Jackson, Chingy, and Cherish, resulting in their respective singles getting no accompanying video or promotion.

Charts

References

2006 singles
LeToya Luckett songs
Songs written by Bryan-Michael Cox
Songs written by LeToya Luckett